The Baladi-rite Prayer is the oldest known prayer-rite used by Yemenite Jews, transcribed in a prayer book (siddur in Ashkenazi terminology) known as tiklāl (plural tikālil) in Yemenite Jewish parlance. "Baladi", as a term applied to the prayer-rite, was not used until prayer books arrived in Yemen in the Sephardic-rite. The Baladi version that is used today is not the original Yemenite version that had been in use by all of Yemen's Jewry until the end of the 16th century and the beginning of the 17th, but has now evolved with various additions under the influence of Sephardi siddurs and the rulings passed down in the Shulchan Aruch. In the middle of the 18th century, Rabbi Yihya Saleh (Maharitz) tried unsuccessfully to create a unified Baladi-rite prayer book, since he devised a fusion between the ancient Yemenite form and Sephardic prayer forms that had already integrated into Yemenite Jewish prayers a hundred years or so years before that.

The Baladi-rite prayer book contains the prayers used by Israel for the entire year, as well as the format prescribed for the various blessings (benedictions) recited. Older Baladi-rite prayer books were traditionally compiled in the Babylonian supralinear punctuation, although today, all have transformed and strictly make use of the Tiberian vocalization. The text, however, follows the traditional Yemenite punctuation of Hebrew words.

First printing
The Baladi-rite prayer book or Tiklāl remained in manuscript form until 1894, when the first printed edition (editio princeps) was published in Jerusalem by the Yemenite Jewish community, which included the Etz Ḥayim commentary written by Rabbi Yihya Saleh. Today, it is used primarily by the Baladi-rite congregations of Yemenite Jews in Israel and the Diaspora. Baladi is an Arabic word denoting "of local use" (i.e. Yemeni), as distinguished from the prayer-rite widely used in the north (i.e. Syria and the Land of Israel), which is called in Arabic  Shāmī "Levantine, Eastern".

Comparison with the Sephardic prayer rite
The Baladi-rite prayer differs in many aspects from the Sephardic rite prayer, or what was known locally as the Shāmī-rite prayer book, which by the 18th and 19th centuries was already widely used in Yemen, although only lately introduced into Yemen by Jewish travelers. Their predilection for books composed in the Land of Israel made them neglect their own hand-written manuscripts, though they were of a more exquisite and ancient origin.

The nineteenth century Jewish historiographer, Hayyim Hibshush, has given some insights into the conflict that arose in the Jewish community of Sana'a on account of the newer Sephardic prayer book being introduced there. Yiḥya, the son of one of the community's most respectable leaders, Shalom ben Aharon HaKohen al-Iraqi (known as al-'Usṭā - "the artisan"), whose father served under two Zaydi Imams between the years 1733–1761 as the surveyor general of public buildings, had tried to make the Sephardic prayer book the standard prayer-rite of all Jews in Yemen in the 18th century. This caused a schism in the Jewish community of Sana'a, with the more zealous choosing to remain faithful to their fathers' custom (i.e. the Baladi-rite) and to continue its perpetuation, since it was seen as embodying the original customs practised by Yemenite Jews. Out of a total of twenty-two synagogues in Sana'a, only three synagogues in the city chose to remain with the original Baladi-rite prayer, while the others adopted the Spanish-rite prayer with its innovations introduced by Isaac Luria. By the time of the Jewish community's demise, owing to mass immigration in the mid-20th century, most synagogues in Sana'a had already returned to praying in the Baladi-rite, albeit, in the vast majority of towns and villages across Yemen they clung to their adopted Sephardic-rite as found in the printed books of Venice, Thessaloniki, Amsterdam and, especially, the Tefillath Haḥodesh and Zekhor le-Avraham prayer books printed in Livorno.

According to Rabbi Yiḥyah Qafiḥ (1850–1931), a Chief Rabbi of Yemen, the original Yemenite version of the Amidah is the format that was prescribed by the Great Assembly, who enacted the prayer in the fourth century BCE, with the one exception of the Benediction said against sectarians, which was enacted many years later. Yihya Saleh (1713–1805) wrote an extensive commentary on the Baladi-rite Prayer Book in which he mostly upholds the old practices described therein (e.g. the practice of saying only one Mussaf-prayer during Rosh Hashanah, etc.),  although he also compromises by introducing elements in the Yemenite prayer book taken from the books of the Kabbalists and the Shulchan Aruch, which had already become popular in Yemen. He is often seen praising the old Yemenite customs and encouraging their continued observance:

Textual development 
Dr. Moshe Gavra who examined more than 700 Yemenite prayer books has concluded that there have always existed differences between those used in Yemen, just as there exist differences between various Sephardic tefillot (Sephardi term for prayer books) and Ashkenazi siddurim. While the ancient format of the Amidah may have seen little changes since its enactment by the latter prophets, the history of the Yemenite Baladi-rite prayer book—as can be said about every prayer book—is a history of recensions and later interpolations, with the addition of elements taken from the Siddur of Rabbi Saadia Gaon and of Rabbi Amram Gaon, the printed Sephardic tefillot, as well as elements taken from liturgies found originally in the Land of Israel. Most of these changes began to make their way into the current Baladi-rite prayer book over a two-hundred year period, from the time of Rabbi Yiḥya Bashiri (d. 1661) who published his Tiklāl Bashiri in 1618 (a copy of which was made and published under the name Tiklāl Qadmonim) to the time of Rabbi Yihya Saleh (d. 1805), the latter of whom incorporating in the Baladi-rite version elements taken from Kabbalah, as prescribed by Isaac Luria (Ari), as well as certain liturgical poems taken from the Sephardic prayer books. In the title page of one Yemenite prayer book completed in 1663 by the notable scribe and kabbalist, Rabbi Isaac b. Abraham Wannah, the copyist makes note of the fact that, aside from the regular customs of the people of Yemen, some of the entries in his prayer book have been culled "from the customs of the people of Spain who have it as their practice to add in the prayers the Tikūn Ha-geshem and the Tikūn Ha-ṭal (special emendations made for rain and for dew so that they may not be withheld), as well as the Tikūnei Shabbat Malkah as is practised by the people of the Land of Israel," i.e., the Psalms readings beginning with לכו נרננה, etc., and the liturgy לכה דודי, followed by בר יוחאי, and יגדל אלהים חי. Originally, the practice was to begin the Sabbath prayer on the night of the Sabbath by reciting only “mizmor shir le'yom ha-shabbath” (Ps. 92). The first recorded mentioning of Tikūn Ha-ṭal (said before the Mussaf-prayer on the first day of Passover) in any extant Yemenite prayer book appeared only in 1583. Included in the Tikūnei Shabbat book were the special readings for the nights of Shavu'ot and Hoshanna Rabba.

The texts of old Yemenite prayer books copied by Rabbi Yihye Bashiri are an invaluable source for comparing the variae lectiones (Textual variations) of liturgy before the redaction of the Babylonian Talmud. For example, in all older Yemenite prayer books copied by Bashiri is found the version גואל ישראל (He who redeems Israel) in the second blessing after Qiryat Shema in the evening prayer and on the night of Passover, that is, in the present-progressive tense instead of in the past tense (גאל ישראל), although the requirement made by Rava in the Talmud (Pesaḥim 117b) calls for saying it in the past tense. Scholars point out that the Yemenite practice was the original custom in Yemen before Rava's interdict, the memorial of which also being brought down in the Jerusalem Talmud.

Changes to the original Yemenite text 
Among the later changes made to the text of the Baladi-rite prayer book is the wording Kether Yitenu, etc., said during the Ḳeddushah (i.e. the third benediction in the prayer itself) at the time of the Mussaf prayer, as is the custom of Spain (Sepharad) with only minor variations. In spite of its wide acceptance in Yemen, among both Baladi and Shāmī congregations, Rabbi Yiḥyah Qafiḥ (d. 1932) did not accept this innovation, but rather ordained in his place of study to continue to say Naqdishakh in all of the prayers, just as had been their accepted tradition from the Great Assembly. The Yemenite adaptation of saying Kether during the Mussaf—although not mentioned in the Order of Prayers prescribed by Maimonides—is largely due to the influence of Amram Gaon's Siddur, which mentions the custom of the two Academies in Babylonia during the days of Natronai ben Hilai to say it during the third benediction of the 'Standing Prayer.' The practice of saying Kether during the Mussaf is also mentioned in the Zohar ("Parashat Pinḥas").

Notable changes occurring in the Baladi-rite prayer book during the geonic period are the additions of Adon ha-ʿolamim, which mark the opening words in the Baladi-rite tiklāl before the Morning benediction, and the praise which appears further on and known as Barukh shʾamar, which appears immediately following a short praise composed by Judah Halevi, Ha-mehulal le'olam and which is said before the recital of the selected Psalms (zemirot). These, among other innovations, have long since been an integral part of the Baladi-rite tiklāl.

In subsequent generations, other additions have been added thereto, such as the Yotzer verses that are said on the Sabbath day (i.e. those verses which mention the creation, hence: yotzer = "who createth"); and the last blessing made in the recital of Ḳiryat Shĕma (i.e. the second blessing thereafter) on the Sabbath evening, since in the original prayer text there was no difference between Sabbaths and weekdays; Likewise, the modern practice is to chant the prosaic Song of the Sea before one recites Yishtabaḥ, although in the original Baladi-rite prayer the song came after Yishtabaḥ, seeing that it is not one of the songs of David. In today's Baladi-rite tiklāl, an interpolation of eighteen verses known as Rafa'eini Adonai we'erafei has been inserted between the prosaic Song of the Sea and Yishtabaḥ, just as it appears in the Tiklāl Mashta, compiled by Rabbi Shalom Shabazi in 1655, although the same verses do not appear in the Tiklāl Bashiri compiled in 1618. Another custom which has found its way into the Yemenite prayer book is the practice of rescinding all vows and oaths on the eve of Yom Kippur (Kol Nidre).

Moreover, in the older handwritten Baladi-rite prayer books, in the first blessing following the Ḳiryat Shĕma, or what is called in  = emeth wayaṣiv, the original Yemenite custom was to say only eight waws in the opening lines of the blessing, just as the blessing appears in Maimonides' Seder Ha-Tefillah (Order of Prayer), and not as it is now commonly practised to insert seven additional waws in the blessing for a total of fifteen. These changes, like the others, are directly related to the dissemination of Sephardic tefillot in Yemen, and influenced, especially, by the writings of Rabbi David Abudirham.

Lurianic Kabbalah 
No doubt the greatest changes to the Baladi-rite prayer book have come in wake of kabbalistic practices espoused by Isaac Luria, which have since been incorporated in the Yemenite tiklāl. The proclamation "" said by some each day before Barukh shĕ'amar is from the teachings of Isaac Luria. The saying of Aleinu le'shebeaḥ (Heb.  "It is for us to praise the Lord of all things", etc.) at the conclusion of the prayer, although originally said only during the Mussaf-prayer on Rosh Hashanah, is also an enactment made by Isaac Luria, Rabbi Moshe ben Machir and Meir ben Ezekiel ibn Gabbai.

Shulchan Aruch 
The Shulchan Aruch has also left an indelible mark upon the Baladi-rite prayer in certain areas. Yihya Saleh (1713–1805) mentions that the old-timers in Yemen were not accustomed to reciting Mizmor le'Todah (i.e. Psalm 100) in the Pesukei dezimra of the Morning Prayer (Shahrith), although it too soon became the norm in the Baladi-rite congregations, based on a teaching in the Shulchan Aruch (Orach Chaim § 51:9) and Rabbi Joseph Karo's specification that it be cited in the Morning Prayer. Yihya Saleh agreed to insert it in his Baladi-rite prayer book, saying that it was deemed just and right to recite it, seeing that “there is in it a plethora of praise unto Him, the Blessed One.”

Yihya Saleh also initiated the custom of saying Ṣidqathekha, etc., in his own synagogue immediately following the Amidah of the Afternoon Prayer (Mincha) on Sabbath days, in accordance with an injunction in the Shulchan Aruch (Orach Chaim § 292:2), and which practice soon spread amongst other Baladi-rite congregations.

The Shulchan Aruch, with Yihya Saleh's endorsement of certain Halachic rulings, was also the cause for other Baladi-rite customs being cancelled altogether, such as the old Yemenite Jewish custom of saying a final blessing after eating the "karpas" (in Yemenite tradition, "parsley") on the night of Passover; and of saying a final blessing over the second cup of wine drunk on the night of Passover; and of making a distinction between the number of matzot that are to be taken up during the blessing when Passover falls on a Sabbath day, as opposed to when it falls on a regular day of the week; and the custom to drink a fifth cup of wine during the Passover Seder. Yihya Saleh also changed the original Baladi-rite practice of gesticulating the lulav (the palm frond and its subsidiaries, viz. the myrtle and willow branches in one's right hand, and the citron fruit in one's left), enacting that instead of the traditional manner of moving them forward, bringing them back, raising them up, and lowering them down, while in each movement he rattles the tip of the lulav three times, they would henceforth add another two cardinal directions, namely, to one's right and to one's left, as described in the Shulchan Arukh (Orach Chaim § 651:9). Not all changes in the prayer book, however, were the result of Yihya Saleh's own decision to force change in his community, but rather Yihya Saleh chose to incorporate some of the Spanish rites and liturgies in the Baladi-rite prayer book since these same practices had already become popular in Yemen. One such practice was to begin the night of each Yom Tov (festival day) with the mizmor related to that particular holiday, although, originally, it was not a custom to do so, but only to begin the first night of each of the three Festival days by saying three mizmorim taken from Psalms 1, 2 and 150. The practice found its way into the Yemenite rite from the Spanish prayer books, whereas now the Yemenite custom incorporates both traditions.

Maimonides' influence 
To what extent Maimonides’ writings actually influenced the development of the Yemenite prayer ritual is disputed by scholars. Some suggest that since the Baladi-rite prayer is almost identical to the prayer format brought down by Maimonides (1138-1204) in his Mishneh Torah that it is merely a copy of Maimonides’ arrangement in prayer. This view, however, is rejected by Rabbi Yosef Qafih (1917–2000) and by Rabbi Avraham Al-Naddaf (1866–1940). According to Rabbi Yosef Qafih, the elders of Yemen preserved a tradition that the textual variant used by Maimonides in his Mishneh Torah was copied down from the texts presented to him by the Jews of Yemen, knowing that they had preserved the ancient format of the prayers, with as few innovations as possible.  Elsewhere, in the Preface to the Yemenite Baladi-rite prayer book, Siyaḥ Yerushalayim, Rabbi Qafih writes that Maimonides searched for the most accurate prayer rite and found the Yemenite version to be the most accurate. According to Rabbi Avraham al-Naddaf, when the prayers established by Ezra and his court (the Men of the Great Assembly) reached Yemen, the Jews of Yemen accepted them and forsook those prayers that they had formerly been accustomed to from the time of the Temple. In subsequent generations, both, in the Land of Israel and in Babylonia, the rabbinic scholars of Israel made additional innovations by adding certain texts and liturgies to the prayer format established by Ezra, which too were accepted by the Jews of Yemen (such as Nishmath kol ḥai, and the prosaic Song of the Sea, established by Rabbi Shimon bar Yochai). Later, penitential verse written by Rabbi Saadia Gaon, by Rabbi Yehudah Halevi and by Rabbi Avraham ibn Ezra came to be incorporated in their prayer books. Eventually, when Maimonides came along and arranged the prayers in his Code of Jewish law, the Jews of Yemen saw that his words were in agreement with what they had in their own prayer books, wherefore, they received him as a rabbi over them, although Maimonides had only written the format that he received from the Men of the Great Assembly, and that it happens to be the original version practised formerly by the Jews of Spain.

Rabbi Avraham al-Naddaf’s view that the Yemenites possessed a version of the prayer before Maimonides' edition reached them is corroborated by an ancient Jewish source contemporaneous with Maimonides’ Mishneh Torah, in which Jewish scholars in Yemen had debated on how to arrange the second blessing after the Shema during the Evening Prayer. The source was copied down by Yihya Saleh from the glosses of the Baladi-rite Prayer Book (Tiklāl) written by Rabbi Yihye Bashiri (d. 1661), and who, in turn, copied it from the work of a Yemenite Jewish scholar, entitled Epistle: Garden of Flowers, in which he wrote the following:

Based on this testimony it is evident that the Talmud, along with Maimonides’ order of the prayer as transcribed in his Mishneh Torah, have been used together to establish the final textual form of the Baladi-rite prayer commonly used in Yemen. Prior to Maimonides, the general trend in Yemen was also to follow the halakhic rulings of the geonim, including their format used in the blessings. Rabbi Saʻīd ibn Daoud al-ʻAdeni, in a commentary which he wrote on Maimonides' Mishneh Torah (ca. 1420 – 1482), writes of the final blessing said over wine: "What is found in the writings of most of the geonim is to conclude the blessing after drinking the fruit of the vine by saying, ['Blessed art Thou, O Lord], for the vine and the fruit of the vine,' and thus is it found written in the majority of the prayer books in the cities throughout Yemen." However, today, in all the Baladi-rite prayer books, the custom after drinking wine is to conclude the blessing with the format that is brought down in Maimonides, "Blessed art Thou, O Lord, for the land and for its fruits", showing that Maimonides' impact over the development of the Yemenite tiklāl has been vital.

Distinguishing features 
The Baladi-rite prayer in its current textual form, at least in its uniqueness as a text that stands in a distinct category of its own and that does not fully conform with any other version, belongs without question to the Babylonian or eastern branch of the prayer ritual variants, a branch whose first clear formulation came through Rabbi Saadia Gaon and his Siddur. By simple comparison with other prayer-rites of other Jewish communities, the Yemenite version shows distinct signs of antiquity, in which, generally speaking, it is possible to say that it is the version least adulterated of all prayer versions practised in Israel today, including the original Ashkenazi version. In spite of a general trend to accommodate other well-known Jewish traditions (e.g. Sephardic, etc.), the Baladi-rite prayer book has still retained much of its traditional distinguishing features. Among them:

In the Baladi-rite tradition, there is no "confession of sins" arranged in alphabetical order, nor is there any confession said immediately prior to saying taḥanūnim (supplications) during nefilat panim following the Standing Prayer. Rather, the custom is to lie upon the floor on one's left side, cover one's head in his talith and to say the supplication, Lefanekha ani korea, etc., followed by Avinu malkeinu, avinu attah, etc., excepting Mondays and Thursdays on which days the petitioner will also add other suppliant verses such as, ana a-donai eloheinu, etc., and wehu raḥum yikhaper 'awon, etc., as are found in the Sephardic prayer books.
The custom of the Jews of Ashkenaz is to read the verses of Ḳiryat Shema ("Shema Yisrael") each man to himself and silently. In contrast, with the Sephardic Jews, the ḥazan reads aloud the verses of Ḳiryat Shema, without the participation of his congregation. With the Yemenites, on the other hand, the entire congregation reads it aloud and in perfect unison. 
The version of the Kaddish used in the Baladi-rite is also unique, containing elements not found in the Siddur/Tefillot used by other communities, and is believed to date back in antiquity. (Open window for text)

In the earlier Baladi-rite prayer books one could not find at the conclusion of the morning, afternoon, and evening prayers the text now widely known as ʻAleinu le-shabeaḥ, but only in the Mussaf-prayer said on Rosh Hashanah. Today, the custom among adherents to the Baladi-rite (like the Italian rite) is to say Aleinu le’shebeaḥ only during the Morning (shaḥrith) and Evening (arvith) prayers, but not in the Afternoon prayer (minḥah).
The older prayer books also contained formularies of documents (Marriage contracts, bills of divorce, court waiver of rights to payment, legal attestations, calendric tables for reckoning the intercalation of the years, etc.) which are lacking in the modern prayer books. Most also contained Halakhic compendia, such as the modi operandi for Havdallah ceremonies at the conclusion of Sabbath days and festival days, and for establishing symbolic joint ownership of a shared courtyard ( 'erub), and for separating the dough portion (ḥallah), as well as for the redemption of one's firstborn son (pidyon haben) and for the ceremony of circumcision. So, too, the Old Baladi-rite prayer books contained a brief overview of the laws governing the making of tassels (tzitzit) worn on garments, and the writing of door-post scripts (mezuzah), inter alia. Most also contained a copious collection of liturgical poems and penitential verse (selichot).
The single individual who prays alone and who is unable to join a quorum of at least ten adult men (minyan) follows nearly the same standard format as those who pray among the congregants. However, unlike the congregation, he that prays alone alters the Kaddish by saying in its place what is known as Bĕrīkh shĕmeh deḳuddsha bĕrikh hū le'eilā le'eilā, etc., both, before and after the Standing Prayer. (Open window for text)

The single individual who prays alone does not say the Keddusha (e.g. Qadosh, Qadosh, Qadosh), but rather says, “Keddushath Adonai Tzevo'oth”, in lieu of the words Qadosh, Qadosh, Qadosh, insofar that the Talmud (Berakhoth 21b) requires a quorum of at least ten adult males to say the Keddusha.

The Baladi-rite custom is not like the custom of the other Jewish communities who separate the biblical pericopes Chukat and Balak during the weekly Sabbath readings. Rather, the Yemenites traditionally connect these two pericopes for most years, while separating the pericopes Masei and Matot.

Megillat Antiochus 
One of the more salient features of all the older Baladi-rite prayer books, as well as those compiled by Rabbi Yiḥya Bashiri, is the Aramaic Megillat Antiochus with Saadia Gaon's Arabic translation, the original Aramaic being written by the elders of the Schools of Shammai and Hillel.

Tractate Avoth 
According to 16th–17th century Yemenite prayer books, many Yemenites, but not all, recited but only the first chapter of Avoth after the Shabbath Minchah prayer, doing so throughout the entire year. Beginning with the 17th century, external influence —just as with the Shami prayer text—brought about completely changed customs, with the prevalent custom today being to read the entire tractate throughout the Sabbaths between Passover and Shavuoth, a chapter each Shabbath as non-Yemenite Jews customarily do. Rabbi Yosef Shalom Koraḥ was quoted as pointing out that in the synagogues of Rabbi Yiḥye Qafih and Rabbi Yiḥye al-Abyadh, rather than apportioning the learning for the Sabbaths between Pesaḥ and Atzeret, they would learn the entire tractate with Maimonides' commentary during the two days of Shavuoth.

First night of Shavuoth 
The custom among Yemenites in recent years was to read the Tikkun in the synagogues on the night of Shevu'ot, although in the old Yemenite tiklālil they did not mention anything unique about the night of Shavuoth compared to other holidays; the practice relating to the Tikkun came to Yemen only from approximately the second half of the eighteenth-century. Furthermore, while in most of the synagogues in Yemen they would learn the "Tikkūn" printed in Machzorim and Sephardic Tefillot, in some they would learn the Sefer Hamitzvot compiled by Maimonides, while by Rabbi Yihya Qafih it was learnt in its original Arabic. Even among the Baladi-rite congregations in Sana'a who embraced Kabbalah, they received with some reservation the custom of the kabbalists to recite the "Tikkūn" all throughout the night, and would only recite the "Tikkūn" until about midnight, and then retire to their beds.

Other features peculiar to the Baladi-rite 
 In Baladi-rite synagogues, the corresponding verses of the weekly Torah reading (parashah) are read aloud from the Targum Onkelos, the Aramaic translation assigned for each verse. This is read on Sabbath mornings, and on holidays, when the Torah-scroll is taken out of the Heikhal and read in public.
 On the night of Passover, the Baladi-rite tiklāl requires making four separate blessings over the four cups of wine prior to drinking them, as prescribed by the Geonim and the Jerusalem Talmud.
 During the seven days of Passover, whenever eating unleavened bread (matzah), the Baladi-rite custom is to always bless over 1  loaves of matzah, whether the day is only a mid-festival day, or a Sabbath day that fell during the mid-festival, or a Festival day itself that fell on a Sabbath day. 
 The Yemenite custom is to make a blessing over the hand washing prior to dipping a morsel (karpas) into a liquid, especially during the night of Passover.
 The blessing over the Hanukkah candles is with the preposition "of" (Heb. של), as in: ברוך אתה יי' אלהינו מלך העולם אשר קדשנו במצותיו וצונו להדליק נר שֶׁלַּחֲנֻכָּה.
 The Baladi-rite custom requires making the blessing, "to dwell in the Sukkah," each time one enters his makeshift booth during the seven days of Sukkoth, even though he had not intended to eat a meal there, in accordance with teachings brought down by Rabbi Isaac ibn Ghiyyat (1038–1089)  and by Maimonides.
 The Grace said after meals (Heb. ברכת המזון) shows an old format, lacking the additions added in subsequent generations by other communities. (Open window for text)

 The "Counting of the Omer" (sefirath ha-ʻomer) between Passover and Shavu'oth is said in Aramaic, rather than in Hebrew. The emissary of the congregation (Shaliach Tzibbur) commences by making one blessing over the counting and fulfills thereby the duty of the entire congregation, although each man makes the counting for himself.
 The textual variant of the third benediction (Ḳeddushah) said in the Mussaf Prayer on Sabbath days shows signs of an early tradition, believed to antedate the version used by other communities (both, Ashkenaz and Sepharad), insofar that the original version was said without mentioning Shema Yisrael Adonai Eloheinu Adonai Eḥad. (Open window for text)

The practice in Yemenite congregations is for the Shaliach Tzibbur (emissary of the congregation; precentor) to say the Berakhot (benedictions) before and after the Shema, while everyone else in the synagogue remains quiet as they listen to him and answer Amen. He is the mouthpiece of the Tzibbur. Those who choose to recite the words along with him, do so silently. Only the Shema itself is recited in unison.

 The Evening Prayer (ʻArvith) on weekdays is unique in that, in the second blessing said after Ḳiryat Shema, there is an extension enacted by the Geonim, now abandoned by  most other communities. (Open window for text) 

 The third blessing of the Amidah retains the same form throughout the Ten Days of Repentance, even on weekdays, with the addition of ובכן.
 In Yemenite public service (both, Baladi and Shāmī), the pesukei dezimra of the Morning Prayer is chanted in unison by the whole sitting congregation, unlike other communities where only one person, usually the Shaliach Tzibbur (precentor), recites it aloud. The same rule applies to the recital of the Qiryath Shema.
 Like the original Ashkenazic custom, in Yemenite public service (both Baladi and Shāmī), only one person says the Kaddish at any given time, but never two or more simultaneously. Moreover, in every Kaddish the words וְיִמְלוֹךְ מַלְכוּתֵיהּ וְיַצְמַח פּוּרְקָנֵיהּ וִיקָרֵב מְשִׁיחֵיהּ וְיִפְרוֹק עַמֵּיהּ are incorporated. The yod in the word וימלוך is vocalized with a ḥiraq, and the lamad with a ḥolam.
 The custom of the Baladi-rite is to answer "Amen" at the conclusion of the benediction known as Yotzer in the Morning Prayer, as also to answer "Amen" during the Evening Prayer at the conclusion of the benediction, Ma'ariv 'Aravim.
 The Cohenim do not have a custom to wash their hands prior to their standing up to bless the congregation.
 On days when they read from two scrolls of the Torah in the synagogue, the Baladi-rite custom is not to take out the two scrolls at one time, but they would take out one scroll, read from it, and after the conclusion of the reading the scroll is returned to the Heikhal and the second scroll taken out and read. The Haftarah is read only after the scrolls have been returned to the Heikhal.
 The Baladi-rite custom, on any given Monday or Thursday, as well as on Rosh Ḥodesh (New Moon), is to return the Scroll of the Law (Torah) to the ark after reading it in the synagogue, before the congregation recites Ashrei yoshəvei vethəkha, 'odh yehallelukha seloh, etc. (אשרי יושבי ביתך עוד יהללוך סלה). This rule, however, does not apply to Sabbath days and Festival days.
 The Yemenite custom (both, Baladi and Shāmī) when reciting the Hallel is that the congregation attentively listens to the Shaliach Tzibbur reading without repeating the words of the Hallel, but only cites the word "Hallelujah," in a repetitious manner, after each verse. "Hallelujah" is repeated 123 times, like the number of years attained by Aaron the High Priest. The congregation will, however, repeat after the Shaliach Tzibbur only a few selected verses from the Hallel, considered as lead verses.
 The Tikkun Chatzot (Midnight Rectification) does not appear in the Baladi-rite liturgies.

Selections from tiklāl 

The 'Standing Prayer' known as the Eighteen Benedictions, or Amidah, as prescribed in the Yemenite Baladi-rite tradition, and which is recited three times a day during weekdays, is here shown (with an English translation): (Open window for text)

Nishmath Kol Hai is recited on the Sabbath day, and dates back to the 5th century CE:

Published tiklāl editions
 Tefillath Kol Pe, ed. Yosef Hasid and Shelomo Siani, Jerusalem 1960
 Siyaḥ Yerushalayim, Baladi prayer book in 4 vols, ed. Yosef Qafih, Kiryat-Ono 1995–2010
 Hatiklāl Hamevo'ar, ed. Pinḥas Qoraḥ, Benei Barak 2006
 Torat Avot, Baladi prayer book (7 vols.), ed. Nathanel b. Yihya Alsheikh, Benei Barak
 Tefillat Avot, Baladi prayer book (6 vols.)
 Tiklāl (Etz Ḥayim Hashalem), ed. Shimon Saleh, 4 volumes, Jerusalem 1979
 Tiklāl Ha-Mefoar (Maharitz) Nosaḥ Baladi, Meyusad Al Pi Ha-Tiklal Im Etz Ḥayim Ha-Shalem Arukh Ke-Minhag Yahaduth Teiman: Bene Berak: Or Neriyah ben Mosheh Ozeri: 2001 or 2002
 Tiklāl ʻim perush ʻEtz Ḥayyim la-maharitz zetz"al, kolel ʻAnaf Ḥayyim - hagahoth we-haʻaroth (ed. Sagiv Mahfud), Nosach Teiman: Bnei Brak 2012
 Tiklāl - ʻAṭereth Avoth (ed. Sagiv Mahfud), Nosach Teiman: Bnei Brak

Baladi as original Yemenite custom
Although the word "Baladi" is used to denote the traditional Yemenite Jewish prayer, the word is also used to designate the old Yemenite Jewish custom in many non-related issues treating on Jewish legal law (Halacha) and ritual practices, and which laws are mostly aligned with the teachings of Maimonides' Code of Jewish Law, as opposed to the Shulchan Arukh of Rabbi Joseph Karo.

One of such practices is to constrict the blood locked within meats before cooking by throwing cut pieces of the meat (after salting and rinsing) into a pot of boiling water, and leaving them there for as long as it takes for the meat to whiten on its outer layer. This practice prevents the blood from oozing out, and is only a rabbinical precautionary measure (Cf. Hullin 111a). If soup was to be made from meat which was thrown into a pot of boiling water, it was not necessary to take out the meat. Rather, the froth and scum which surfaces were scooped away, and this sufficed. It was also a Jewish practice in Yemen that when salting the cut meat, the pieces are prepared no larger than half a roṭal (about the size of half an orange) so as to permit the effectiveness of the salt on that meat.
The Baladi custom is to make tzitzit (tassels) with only seven "joints", without counting the first square-knot that is tied to the tassel where it is attached to the cloth. These seven "joints" each consist of only three windings and are not separated by knots. They are placed on the upper  length of the tassel, symbolic of the seven firmaments in heaven, while in the other  length of the tassel the strings are left to hang loose. Their Rabbis have interpreted the Talmud (Menahoth 39a) with a view that the "joints" and the "knots" are one and the same thing.

Another custom of the Baladi-rite community (which is also true of the Shāmī-rite community) is for a child to read aloud the Aramaic translation (Targum Onkelos) in the synagogues on Sabbath days, during the weekly biblical lection, as well as on holidays. The custom is for the Aramaic translation to be read one verse at a time, following each verse that is read aloud from the scroll of the Law (Torah), a practice long since abandoned by other communities.
The Baladi-rite custom of tying the knot on the head phylactery (Tefillin) follows the custom mentioned in Halakhot Gedolot (Hil. Shimushei Tefillin): "One doubles the two heads (i.e. ends) of the straps [in the form of two separate loops] and feeds one through the other, and the head (i.e. end) of the one in the end (loop) of the other, so that there is formed thereby the shape of a daleth." Practically speaking, its shape is only an imaginary daleth, made also in accordance with the old manner prescribed by the Jews of Ashkenaz (an illustration of its tying method shown here).
The Baladi-rite custom is to wear one's large talith on the night of the Sabbath, as well as on the night of any given Festival day.

References

Bibliography

 (reprinted from Jerusalem editions, 1907, 1917 and 1988)

 

 







Further reading 
 TEMA - Journal of Judeo-Yemenite Studies (ed. Yosef Tobi), vol. 7. Association for Society and Culture, Netanya 2001. Article: Nosaḥ ha-tefillah shel yehudei teyman, pp. 29 – 64 (Hebrew)

External links 
 Sefer Rekhev Elohim, Chapter 8, concerning the influence of Spanish-rite Prayer books on the Yemenite siddur; pp. 48–57 (Hebrew)
 Gleanings from the Yemenite Liturgy by George Margoliouth (the Jewish Quarterly Review)
 Caro's Shulhan Arukh versus Maimonides' Mishneh Torah in Yemen, by Yosef Tobi

Yemenite Jews
Jewish law and rituals
Jewish belief and doctrine
Jewish Yemeni history
Nusachs
Siddur versions
Jews and Judaism in Yemen